The Museum of the National Struggle for Liberation is a history museum located in the town of Jajce, in the Central Bosnia Canton of Bosnia and Herzegovina.

History 
Anti-Fascist Council for the National Liberation of Yugoslavia or AVNOJ was a political body formed during World War II that inspired to represent all people of Yugoslavia. After capitulation of Italy and destruction of Chetnik army  by the autumn of 1943 AVNOJ was recognized by Allies of World War II. On November 29–30, 1943 AVNOJ held it second congress in Jajce. Following Josip Broz Tito  proposal, AVNOJ was proclaimed a legislative body, King Peter II of Yugoslavia and his government has been denied the right to represent Yugoslav peoples and banned from returning from exile. The new government  - National Committee for the Liberation of Yugoslavia or NKOJ - has been formed, and Josip Broz Tito was granted title of Marshal, per Moša Pijade proposal. After formation of the Republic of Yugoslavia November 29 was celebrated as Day of the Republic, a national holiday.

See also 
Museum of Yugoslavia
 
 List of museums in Bosnia and Herzegovina

References 

History museums in Bosnia and Herzegovina
Bosnian nationalism
Central Bosnia Canton